The Holstein Friesian is an international breed or group of breeds of dairy cattle. It originated in the Dutch provinces of North Holland and Friesland and in Schleswig-Holstein in northern Germany. It is the dominant breed in industrial dairy farming worldwide, and is found in more than 160 countries. It is known by many names, among them Holstein, Friesian and Black and White.

With the growth of the New World, a demand for milk developed in North America and South America, and dairy breeders in those regions at first imported their livestock from the Netherlands. However, after about 8,800 Friesians (black pied German cows) had been imported, Europe stopped exporting dairy animals due to disease problems.

Today, the breed is used for milk in the north of Europe, and for meat in the south of Europe. After 1945, European cattle breeding and dairy products became increasingly confined to certain regions due to the development of national infrastructure. This change led to the need to designate some animals for dairy production and others for beef production. (Previously, milk and beef had been produced from dual-purpose animals.) Today, more than 80% of dairy production takes place north of the line between Bordeaux and Venice, and more than 60% of the cattle in Europe are found there as well. Today's European breeds, national derivatives of the Dutch Friesian, have become very different animals from those developed by breeders in the United States, who use Holsteins only for dairy production.

As a result, breeders have imported specialized dairy Holsteins from the United States to cross-breed them with European black-and-whites. Today, the term "Holstein" is used to describe North or South American stock and the use of that stock in Europe, particularly in Northern Europe. "Friesian" is used to describe animals of traditional European ancestry that are bred for both dairy and beef use. Crosses between the two are described as "Holstein-Friesian".

Breed characteristics

Holsteins have distinctive markings, usually black and white or red and white in colour, typically exhibiting piebald patterns. On rare occasions, some have both black and red colouring with white. Red factor causes this unique colouring. 'Blue' is also a known colour. This colour is produced by white hairs mixed with the black hairs giving the cow a bluish tint. This colouring is also known as 'blue roan' in some farm circles. They are famed for their high dairy production, averaging  of milk per year. Of this milk, 858 pounds (3.7%) are butterfat and 719 pounds (3.1%) are protein.

A healthy calf weighs 40 to 50 kg (75–110 lb) or more at birth. A mature Holstein cow typically weighs 680–770 kg (1500–1700 lb), and stands 145–165 cm (58–65 in) tall at the shoulder. Holstein  should be bred by 11 to 14 months of age, when they weigh 317–340 kg (700–750 lb) or 55% of adult weight. Generally, breeders plan for Holstein heifers to calve for the first time between 21 and 24 months of age and 80% of adult bodyweight. The gestation period is about nine and a half months.

History

Near 100 BC, a displaced group of people from Hesse migrated with their cattle to the shores of the North Sea near the Frisii tribe, occupying the island of Batavia, between the Rhine, Maas, and Waal. Historical records suggest these cattle were black, and the Friesian cattle at this time were "pure white and light coloured". Crossbreeding may have led to the foundation of the present Holstein-Friesian breed, as the cattle of these two tribes from then are described identically in historical records.

The portion of the country bordering on the North Sea, called Frisia, was situated within the provinces of North Holland, Friesland and Groningen, and in Germany to the River Ems. The people were known for their care and breeding of cattle. The Frisii, preferring pastoral pursuits to warfare, paid a tax of ox hides and ox horns to the Roman government, whereas the Batavii furnished soldiers and officers to the Roman army; these fought successfully in the various Roman wars. The Frisii bred the same strain of cattle unadulterated for 2,000 years, except from accidental circumstances. In 1282 AD, floods produced the Zuiderzee, a formed body of water that had the effect of separating the cattle breeders of the modern day Frisians into two groups. The western group occupied West Friesland, now part of North Holland; the eastern occupied the present provinces of Friesland and Groningen, also in the Netherlands.

The rich polder land in the Netherlands is unsurpassed for the production of grass, cattle, and dairy products. Between the 13th and 16th centuries, the production of butter and cheese was enormous.  Historic records describe heavy beef cattle, weighing from 2,600 to 3,000 pounds each.

The breeders had the goal of producing as much milk and beef as possible from the same animal.  The selection, breeding and feeding have been carried out with huge success. Inbreeding was not tolerated, and (distinct) families never arose, although differences in soil in different localities produced different sizes and variations.

A Corporate Watch report on Dystopian Farming  cited a 2004 study from the Journal of Dairy Science identified that between 96 and 98% of UK Holsteins were inbred to some degree, compared with around 50% in 1990. More generally the rate of inbreeding in the UK has risen significantly since 1990.

United Kingdom
Up to the 18th century, the British Isles imported Dutch cattle, using them as the basis of several breeds in England and Scotland. The eminent David Low recorded, "the Dutch breed was especially established in the district of Holderness, on the north side of the Humber; northward through the plains of Yorkshire. The finest dairy cattle in England...", of Holderness in 1840 still retained the distinct traces of their Dutch origin.

Further north in the Tees area, farmers imported continental cattle from the Netherlands and German territories on the Elbe. Low wrote, "Of the precise extent of these early importations we are imperfectly informed, but that they exercised a great influence on the native stock appears from this circumstance, that the breed formed by the mixture became familiarly known as the Dutch or Holstein breed".

Holstein-Friesians were found throughout the rich lowlands of the Netherlands, northwestern provinces of Germany, Belgium and northern France. The breed did not become established in Great Britain at the time, nor was it used in the islands of Jersey or of Guernsey, which bred their own special cattle named after the islands.  Their laws prohibited using imports from the continent for breeding purposes.  After World War II, breeders on the islands needed to restore their breeds, which had been severely reduced during the war, and imported almost 200 animals.  Canadian breeders sent a gift of three yearling bulls to help establish the breed.

The pure Holstein Breed Society was started in 1946 in Great Britain, following the British Friesian Cattle Society. The breed was developed slowly up to the 1970s, after which there was an explosion in its popularity, and additional animals were imported.  More recently, the two societies merged in 1999 to establish Holstein UK.

Numbers

Records on 1 April 2005 from Nomenclature for Units of Territorial Statistics level 1 show Holstein influence appearing in 61% of all 3.47 million dairy cattle in the UK:
 Holstein-Friesian (Friesian with more than 12.5% and less than 87.5% of Holstein blood): 1,765,000 (51%)
 Friesian (more than 87.5% Friesian blood): 1,079,000 (31%)
 Holstein (more than 87.5% of Holstein blood): 254,000 (7%)
 Holstein-Friesian cross (any of the above crossed with other breeds): 101,000 (3%)
 Other dairy breeds: 278,000 (7%)

The above statistics are for all dairy animals possessing passports at the time of the survey, i.e. including young stock. DEFRA lists just over 2 million adult dairy cattle in the UK.

Definition

Holstein in this instance, and indeed in all modern discussion, refers to animals traced from North American bloodlines, while Friesian refers to indigenous European black and white cattle.

Criteria for inclusion in the Supplementary Register (i.e. not purebred) of the Holstein UK herd book are:

Class A is for a typical representative of the Holstein or Friesian breed, as to type, size and constitution, with no obvious signs of crossbreeding, or be proved from its breeding records to contain between 50% and 74.9% Holstein genes or Friesian genes. If the breeding records show that one parent is of a breed other than Holstein-Friesian, Holstein, or Friesian, then such parent must be a purebred animal fully registered in a herd book of a dairy breed society recognized by the Society.

Class B is for a calf by a bull registered or dual registered in the Herd Book or in the Supplementary Register and out of a foundation cow or heifer registered in Class A or B of the Supplementary Register and containing between 75% and 87.4% Holstein genes or Frisian genes.

For inclusion in the Pure (Holstein or Friesian) herd book, a heifer or bull calf from a cow or heifer in Class B of the Supplementary Register and by a bull registered or dual registered in the Herd Book or the Supplementary Register, and containing 87.5% or more Holstein genes or Frisian genes will be eligible to have its entry registered in the Herd Book.

Production
The breed currently averages 7,655 litres/year throughout 3.2 lactations with pedigree animals averaging 8,125 litres/year over an average of 3.43 lactations. By adding, lifetime production therefore stands at around 26,000 litres.

United States

History

Black and white cattle from Europe were introduced into the US from 1621 to 1664. The eastern part of New Netherland (modern day New York and Connecticut), where many Dutch farmers settled along the Hudson and Mohawk River valleys. They probably brought cattle with them from their native land and crossed them with cattle purchased in the colony. For many years afterwards, the cattle here were called Dutch cattle and were renowned for their milking qualities.

The first recorded imports were more than 100 years later, consisting of six cows and two bulls. These were sent in 1795 by the Holland Land Company, which then owned large tracts in New York, to their agent, Mr. John Lincklaen of Cazenovia. A settler described them thus, "the cows were of the size of oxen, their colors clear black and white in large patches; very handsome".

In 1810, a bull and two cows were imported by the Hon. William Jarvis for his farm at Wethersfield, Vermont. About the year 1825, another importation was made by Herman Le Roy, a part of which was sent into the Genesee River valley. The rest were kept near New York City. Still later, an importation was made into Delaware. No records were kept of the descendants of these cattle. Their blood was mingled and lost in that of the native cattle.

The first permanent introduction of this breed was due to the perseverance of Hon. Winthrop W. Chenery, of Belmont, Massachusetts. The animals of his first two importations, and their offspring, were destroyed by the government in Massachusetts because of a contagious disease. He made a third importation in 1861. This was followed in 1867 by an importation for the Hon. Gerrit S. Miller, of Peterboro, New York, made by his brother, Dudley Miller, who had been attending the noted agricultural school at Eldena (Königlich Preußische Staats- und landwirthschaftliche Akademie zu Greifswald und Eldena; the latter today a locality of the former), Prussia, where this breed was highly regarded. These two importations, by Hon. William A. Russell, of Lawrence, Mass., and three animals from East Friesland, imported by Gen. William S. Tilton of the National Military Asylum, Togus, Maine, formed the nucleus of the Holstein Herd Book.

The Trina Holstein breed was established by the Merrill farming family in Maine in the early 20th century, begun by "Trina Redstone Marvel" (or "Old Trina") and continued at Wilsondale Farm in Gray, Maine. Trina was traced back sixteen generations to one of the first cows imported into the United States from New Netherland. There are thirty generations of Trina Holstein offspring today.

After about 8,800 Holsteins had been imported, a cattle disease broke out in Europe and importation ceased.

In the late 19th century, there was enough interest among Friesian breeders to form associations to record pedigrees and maintain herd books. These associations merged in 1885, to found the Holstein-Friesian Association of America. In 1994, the name was changed to Holstein Association USA, Inc.

Production

Total lifetime productivity can be inferred from the average lifetime of US cows.

The current national Holstein milk production leader is Bur-Wall Buckeye Gigi EX-94 3E, which produced  of milk in 365 days, completing her record in 2016.

The considerable advantage, compared to the UK, for example, can be explained by several factors:
 Use of milk production hormone, recombinant bST: A study in February 1999 determined the "response to bST over a 305-day lactation equaled 894 kg of milk, 27 kg of fat, and 31 kg of protein". Monsanto Company estimates a figure of about 1.5 million of 9 million dairy cows are being treated with rBST, or about 17% of cows nationally.
 Greater use of three-times-per-day milking: In a study performed in Florida between 1984 and 1992 using 4293 Holstein lactation records from eight herds, 48% of cows were milked three times a day. The practice was responsible for an extra 17.3% milk, 12.3% fat, and 8.8% protein. Three-times-a-day milking has become a common in recent years. Twice-a-day milking is the most common milking schedule of dairy cattle. In Europe, Australia, and New Zealand, milking at 10- to 14-hour intervals is common.
 Higher cow potential (100% Holstein herds): European Friesian types traditionally had lower production performances than their North American Holstein counterparts. Despite Holstein influence over the last 50 years, a large genetic trace of these cattle is still present.
 Greater use of total mixed ration (TMR) feeding systems: TMR systems continue to expand in use on dairy farms. A 1993 Hoard's Dairyman survey reported 29.2% of surveyed US dairy farms had adopted this system of feeding dairy cows. A 1991 Illinois dairy survey found 26% of Illinois dairy farmers used TMR rations with 300 kg more milk per cow compared to other feeding systems. The American type of operation (North and South America) is characterised by large, loose-housing operations, TMR feeding, and relatively many employees. However, dairy farms in the northeast US and parts of Canada differ from the typical American operation. There, many smaller family farms with either loose-housing or stanchion barns are found. These operations are quite similar to the European type, which is characterised by relatively small operations where each cow is fed and treated individually.

Genetics

The golden age of Friesian breeding occurred during the last 50 years, greatly helped lately by embryo transfer techniques, which permitted a huge multiplication of bulls entering progeny testing of elite, bull-mother cows.

Friesian bull, Osborndale Ivanhoe, b. 1952, brought stature, angularity, good udder conformation, and feet and leg conformation, but his daughters lacked strength and depth. His descendants included:
 Round Oak Rag Apple Elevation, b. 1965, often abbreviated RORA Elevation, was another top-notch bull. He sired over 70,000 Holstein cattle, with descendants numbering over 5 million; Elevation was named Bull of the Century by Holstein International Association in 1999. Elevation was the result of a cross of Tidy Burke Elevation being used on one of the best ever Ivanhoe daughters, Round Oak Ivanhoe Eve. He was unsurpassed at the time for type and production.
 Penstate Ivanhoe Star, b. 1963, sired daughters with similar stature and dairy traits as the Ivanhoes, but with higher production. He also notably sired Carlin-M Ivanhoe Bell, the great production bull of the 80s, known also for good udders, feet and legs. A present-day genetic disorder, complex vertebral malformation, has been traced to Carlin-M Ivanhoe Bell and Penstate Ivanhoe Star.
 Hilltop Apollo Ivanhoe, b. 1960, sire of Whittier Farms Apollo Rocket, b. 1967, was the highest milk production bull of the 1970s, and Wayne Spring Fond Apollo, b. 1970, was the first bull ever to have a milk transmission index of over 2,000 M and have a positive type index. "Wayne" had a very famous daughter, To-Mar Wayne Hay, that was dam of the great To-Mar Blackstar, b. 1983.

Genetic anomalies

Cloning

Starbuck (2)II, clone of the famous CIAQR sire Hanoverhill Starbuck, was born on 7 September 2000 in Saint-Hyacinthe. The clone is a result of the combined efforts of CIAQ, L'Alliance Boviteq Inc, and the Faculté de médecine vétérinaire de l'Université de Montréal. The cloned calf was born 21 years and 5 months after Starbuck's own birth date and just under 2 years after his death (17 September 1998). The calf weighed 54.2 kg at birth and showed the same vital signs as calves produced from regular AI or ET. Starbuck II is derived from frozen fibroblast cells, recovered one month before the death of Starbuck.

The Semex Alliance also cloned other bulls, such as Hartline Titanic, Canyon-Breeze Allen, Ladino-Park Talent, and Braedale Goldwyn.

A huge controversy in the UK in January 2007 linked the cloning company Smiddiehill and Humphreston Farm owned by father-and-son team Michael and Oliver Eaton (also owners of the large, Birmingham-based stone product business, BS Eaton) with a calf that was cloned from a cow in Canada. Despite their efforts to block the farm from view of the press, news cameras broadcast this as breaking news among many of the country's top news stations.  Since then, this calf had been rumored to have been put down to protect the owners, the Eatons, from invasions of the press.

British Friesian cattle

While interest in increasing production through indexing and lifetime profit scores had a huge increase in Holstein bloodlines in the UK, proponents of the traditional British Friesian did not see things that way, and maintain these criteria do not reflect the true profitability or the production of the Friesian cow.

Friesian breeders say modern conditions in the UK, similar to the 1950s through to the 1980s, with low milk price and the need for extensive, low-cost systems for many farmers, may ultimately cause producers to re-examine the attributes of the British Friesian.

This animal came to dominate the UK dairy cow population during these years, with exports of stock and semen to many countries throughout the world. Although the idea of "dual-purpose" animals has arguably become outmoded, the fact remains that the Friesian is eminently suitable for many farms, particularly where grazing is a main feature of the system.

Proponents argue that Friesians last for more lactations through more robust conformation, thus spreading depreciation costs. An added advantage of income from the male calf exists, which can be placed into barley beef systems (finishing from 11 months) or steers taken on to finish at two years, on a cheap system of grass and silage. Very respectable grades can be obtained, commensurate with beef breeds, thereby providing extra income for the farm.

Such extensive, low-cost systems may imply lower veterinary costs, through good fertility, resistance to lameness, and a tendency to higher protein percentage, and, therefore, higher milk price.  An 800-kg Holstein has a higher daily maintenance energy requirement than the 650-kg Friesian.

Friesians have also been disadvantaged through the comparison of their type to a Holstein base. A separate "index" be composed to greater has been suggested to reflect the aspects of maintenance for bodyweight, protein percentage, longevity, and calf value. National Milk Records figures suggest highest yields are achieved between the fifth and seventh lactations; if so, this is particularly so for Friesians, with a greater lift for mature cows, and sustained over more lactations. However, production index only takes the first five lactations into account.
British Friesian breeding has certainly not stood still, and through studied evaluation, substantial gains in yield have been achieved without the loss of type.

History
Friesians were imported into the east coast ports of England and Scotland, from the lush pastures of North Holland, during the 19th century until live cattle importations were stopped in 1892, as a precaution against endemic foot and mouth disease on the Continent. They were so few in number, they were not included in the 1908 census.

In 1909, though, the society was formed as the British Holstein Cattle Society, soon to be changed to British Holstein Friesian Society and, by 1918, to the British Friesian Cattle Society.

The Livestock Journal of 1900 referred to both the "exceptionally good" and "remarkably inferior" Dutch cattle. The Dutch cow was also considered to require more quality fodder and need more looking after than some English cattle that could easily be out-wintered.

In an era of agricultural depression, breed societies notably had flourished, as a valuable export trade developed for traditional British breeds of cattle. At the end of 1912, the herd book noted 1,000 males and 6,000 females, the stock which originally formed the foundation of the breed in England and Scotland. Entry from then until 1921, when grading up was introduced, was by pedigree only.

No other Friesian cattle were imported until the official importation of 1914, which included several near descendants of the renowned dairy bull Ceres 4497 F.R.S. These cattle were successful in establishing the Friesian as an eminent, long-lived dairy breed in Britain. This role was continued in the 1922 importation from South Africa through Terling Marthus and Terling Collona, which were also near descendants of Ceres 4497.

The 1936 importation from the Netherlands introduced a more dual-purpose type of animal, the Dutch having moved away from the Ceres line in the meantime.

The 1950 importation has a lesser influence on the breed today than the previous importations, although various Adema sons were used successfully in some herds.

The Friesian enjoyed great expansion in the 1950s, through to the 80s, until the increased Holstein influence on the national herd in the 1990s ; a trend which is being questioned by some commercial dairy farmers in the harsh dairying climate that prevails today, with the need to exploit grazing potential to the fullest.

Friesian semen is once again being exported to countries with grass-based systems of milk production. The modern Friesian is pre-eminently a grazing animal, well able to sustain itself over many lactations, on both low-lying and upland grasslands, being developed by selective breeding over the last 100 years. Some outstanding examples of the breed have 12 to 15 lactations to their credit, emphasising their inherent natural fecundity. In response to demand, protein percentages have been raised across the breed, and herd protein levels of 3.4% to 3.5% are not uncommon.

Whilst the British Friesian is first and foremost a dairy breed, giving high lifetime yields of quality milk from home-produced feeds, by a happy coincidence, surplus male animals are highly regarded as producers of high quality, lean meat, whether crossed with a beef breed or not. Beef-cross heifers have long been sought after as ideal suckler cow replacements.

Although understanding the need to change the society's name to include the word Holstein in 1988, British Friesian enthusiasts are less than happy now that the word Friesian has been removed from the name. With the history of the breed spanning 100 years, the British Friesian cow is continuing to prove her worth. The general robustness and proven fertility provide an ideal black and white cross for Holstein breeders seeking these attributes.

The disposal of male black and white calves continues to receive media attention, and would appear to be a waste of a valuable resource.  One of the great strengths of the British Friesian is the ability of the male calf to finish and grade satisfactorily, either in intensive systems, or as steers, extensively.  This latter system may become increasingly popular due to the prohibitive increase in grain prices. The robustness of the British Friesian and its suitability to grazing and forage systems is well known.

Compared to the Holsteins, the Friesians:
 Calve more frequently
 Calve more often in their lifetimes
 Need fewer replacements
 Provide valuable male calves
 Have lower cell counts
 Have higher fat and protein percentages

Polled Holsteins
The first polled Holstein was identified in the United States in 1889. Polled Holsteins have the dominant polled gene which makes them naturally hornless. The polled gene has historically had a very low gene frequency in the Holstein breed. However, with animal welfare concerns surrounding the practice of dehorning, the interest in polled genetics is growing rapidly.

Red and white Holsteins

The expression of red colour replacing the black in Holsteins is a function of a recessive gene. Assuming the allele 'B' stands for the dominant black and 'b' for the recessive red, cattle with the paired genes 'BB', 'Bb', or 'bB' would be black and white, while 'bb' cattle would be red and white.

History

Earlier 13th-century records show cattle of "broken" colours entered the Netherlands from Central Europe. Most foundation stock in the US were imported between 1869 and 1885. A group of early breeders decreed that animals of any colour other than black and white would not be accepted in the herd book, and that the breed would be known as Holsteins. There were objections, saying that quality and not colour should be the aim, and that the cattle should be called "Dutch" rather than Holsteins.

Only a small number of carriers were identified over the hundred-year span from the early importations until they were accepted into the Canadian and American herd books in 1969 and 1970, respectively. Most of the early accounts of red calves being born to black and white parents were never documented. A few stories of "reds" born to elite parents persist over time, as there is a tendency to credit the ancestor with the highest (closest) relationship to a red-carrier animal as the one that transmitted the trait, whereas sometimes it is the other parental line that has passed it on, even though the ancestor responsible may have entered the pedigree several generations earlier.

In 1952, a sire in an artificial insemination (AI) unit in the US was a carrier of red coat colour. Although the AI unit reported the condition and advised breeders as to its mode of inheritance, almost a third of the breeding unit's Holstein inseminations that year were to that red-carrier bull. That year, American AI units had used 67 red-factor bulls that had sired 8250 registered progeny. In spite of this, any change to the colour marking rules was rejected.

The Red and White Dairy Cattle Association (RWDCA) began registry procedures in 1964 in the United States. Its first members were Milking Shorthorn breeders, who wanted a dairy registry for the cattle they had bred in prior years, including some red and white Holsteins. When Milking Shorthorn breeders were looking for potential outcrossing individuals to improve milk production, red and white Holsteins came into the picture, since the red colour factor is the same for both breeds. The RWDCA had adopted an "open herd book" policy, and the Red and White Holstein became the major player.

The red trait was thus able to survive the attempts to eradicate it that came from all sides of the Holstein industry. It was inevitable that even when a red calf was culled, the herd owner rarely did anything to remove the dam from his herd and only hoped she would not have another red calf. Many red calves, born in both countries prior to the 1970s, were quietly disposed of, with a view to preserving the acceptance of their elite pedigrees.

Also, thousands of Holsteins were imported from Canada each year, and many were carriers. More than 14,000 Holsteins were exported to the United States in 1964 and again in 1965. This was at a time when both countries were debating the "red question". While the United States was trying to eliminate the red trait, the Canadian imports simply counterbalanced the US effort to reduce its incidence.

Canada's number one red-carrier sire in the 1940s was A.B.C. Reflection Sovereign. His sons and grandsons in the 1950s and '60s spread the red gene throughout Canada and increased its frequency in the United States. Three other big names siring Red and Whites in the United States were Rosafe Citation R, Roeland Reflection Sovereign, and Chambric A.B.C. The red trait was readily available in Canadian Holstein genetics.

Early on, there was criticism of the policy of the Canadian AI units to remove bulls found to carry red. A number of superior bulls were slaughtered or exported. The studs were simply supporting the Canadian policy to prevent the intensification of the red recessive in the breed. The phrase "carries the red factor" had to be included in the description, and excessive promotion of unproven red-factor bulls was discouraged. They later added the aim of permitting intelligent breeders to use any red-carrier sire that had an outstanding proof for production and type.

It became obvious that AI was the primary way of finding out which bulls were red carriers. Prior to AI, few red-carrier sires were uncovered because their service was limited to one or a few herds. Such herds often had no carrier females, and there was only a 25% chance that a carrier bull mated to a carrier female would produce a red calf. If a red and white calf were  dropped, it was often concealed and quietly removed from the herd.

In 1964, the Netherlands Herd Book Society indicated a breakdown of 71% Black and White Friesian and 28% Red and Whites. A herd book that accepted Red and Whites had already been established in the United States. A separate herd book for Canadian Red and Whites was then established, following which Red and Whites became acceptable to the major Canadian (export) markets. The sales ring began to establish interest in the new breed.

The US Holstein-Friesian Association and its membership worked diligently from its early days until 1970 to eliminate the red trait from the registered population. However, once the door was open, red and whites began to appear in some of the more elite herds. The rush to get the best of Canadian breeding even prior to the opening of the herd book brought red calves to many dairymen who had never even seen one.

Canadian Red and Whites became eligible for registration in the herd book on July 1, 1969, through an alternate registry. Red and Whites were to be listed with the suffix –RED and Black and Whites with ineligible markings would be registered with the suffix –ALT. Both groups and their progeny would be listed only in the Alternate book and the suffixes had to be part of the name. In the Canadian herd books, all –Alt and -Red animals were listed in the regular herd book in registration number order and were identified with an A in front of their numbers. The Alternates were separate in name only. The A in front of the registration number was discontinued in 1976 and the –Alt suffix was dropped in 1980, but –Red was continued. It did not bar the registration of animals whose hair turned from red to black. 

The US Holstein Association decided not to have a separate herd book for red and whites and off-color animals. The suffixes of –Red and –OC would be used, and numbering would be consecutive. The first red and white Holsteins were recorded with an R in front of their numbers. 212 males and 1191 females were recorded in the initial group of red registrations. Red and Whites registered in the Canadian herd book numbered 281 in 1969 and 243 in 1970.

An American Breeders Service ad in the Canadian Holstein Journal in 1974 on Hanover-Hill Triple Threat mentioned one of several colour variants that were not true red. Its existence was undoubtedly common knowledge among breeders in both countries, but  until that time, it had not been mentioned in print. Calves were born red and white and registered as such, but over the first six months of age turned black or mostly black with some reddish hairs down the backline, around the muzzle and at the poll. The hair coat colour change became known as Black/Red and sometimes as Telstar/Red, since the condition appeared in calves sired by Roybrook Telstar. Telstar was the sire of Triple Threat, but nothing about this had hitherto been in print about Telstar, which was by then over 10 years old.

Black/Reds were often discriminated against when sold and were barred from Red and White-sponsored shows. In 1984, Holstein Canada considered recoding B/R bulls that had always been coded simply as red carriers, a designation that was not acceptable to all buyers. The breed agreed to change after checking with other breed associations and with the AI industry. In 1987, Holstein Canada and the Canadian AI industry modified their coding procedures to distinguish between Black/Red and true red colour patterns for bulls. Holstein Canada dropped the suffix Red as a part of the name in 1990, but continued to carry it as part of the birth date and other codes field.

.

Notable Holsteins 

 Ubre Blanca, Fidel Castro's cow (1972–1985)
 Pauline Wayne, US president William Howard Taft's cow
 RORA Elevation, a prize-winning bull
 Pawnee Farm Arlinda Chief, a bull with great genes for milk production; however, he also introduced a lethal gene into the population
 Belle Sarcastic, "unofficial mascot" of Michigan State University Archives and Historical Collections
 Kian (1997-2013), the first red Holstein bull whose semen has sold more than one million units worldwide
 Osborndale Ivanhoe (1952-1970), Holstein bull owned by Frances Osborne Kellogg and mated 100,187 times and whose semen was shipped all over the world.
 Toystory (2001-2014), Holstein bull whose semen has sold more than 2.4 million units worldwide and has been estimated to have sired over 500,000 offspring
 Knickers, an extremely large bull from  Western Australia, which was making worldwide headlines in November 2018 for being too large to be processed at the local abattoirs.

References

Other sources 

 Low, David (1845) On the Domesticated Animals of the British Islands: Comprehending the Natural and Economical History of Species and Varieties; the Description of the Properties of External Form; and Observations on the Principles and Practice of Breeding, Longman, Brown, Green, & Longmans.

External links

 Ontario Plaques – Holstein Friesian Cattle in Ontario
 World Holstein-Friesian Federation
 Holstein Association USA

Dairy cattle breeds
Cattle breeds originating in Germany
Cattle breeds originating in the Netherlands